SS Binnendijk was a Dutch steel cargo ship lost off Portland Bill in the English Channel in 1939. The ship has become locally known as 'The Benny' and its wreck remains a dive site.

History
The ship was built by a sub-company of the ship building tycoon Bonn & Mees; Werf De Noord N. V., Ablasserdam of Rotterdam during 1921, as part of a large order from the Holland and America line known as Nederlandsche-Amerikaansche Stoomvaart. The SS Binnendijk was a type "B" class ship. With a gross tonnage of 6875, the ship was powered by 3 steam turbines with double reduction gearing (single screw) and had a shaft horsepower of 3000, giving the ship a max speed of 12.5 knots. The engine was built by Harland & Wolff Ltd., of Belfast & Glasgow. The ship was 121.9 metres in length, 16.5 metres in beam and 11.9 metres in draught. Shortly after finishing this order Bonn & Mees were forced into liquidation by trade union strikes. Holding a crew of 42, the captain was W.P.J. Morée.

During September 1939, the ship set sail from Boston in New York City and was bound for Rotterdam. Upon her arrival into the English Channel the Royal Navy requested the ship to dock in either Weymouth or the Isle of Portland (Portland Harbour) for an inspection due to suspicion of the ship carrying contraband. On 7 October 1939 the ship travelled to Portland, where captain Morée requested the ship drop her anchor off of the Shambles Sandbank as the sun was setting. By 10pm the ship struck a newly developed German magnetic mine, which had been laid by the German submarine U-26 on 10 September 1939. This occurred around 2.5 miles south east of the Shambles light. The mine, which was one of the first types used in combat, caused the ship to become ablaze before sinking slowly. At the time of sinking SS Binnendijk was alight from stem to stern. The ship sank about 1 mile north of the Lightvessel at 2am the next day. The wreck was dispersed by explosives on 10 October.

As reported in the Liverpool Daily Post of 9 October 1939, there were no fatalities on the ship, and all 41 survivors landed in a lifeboat which stood by all night. Morée was revealed to have been on the bridge when the explosion put the engines and wireless out of action. He was quoted as to stating "The ship began to sink very slowly and when we fired rocket signals, they were answered... Later an examination vessel came alongside and making fast to our ship, took us off. There were 41 officers and crew, we had no passengers."

Binnendijk had a total of seven sister ships: Bilderdijk, which was torpedoed by a submarine on 19 November 1940 sailing from Halifax to Liverpool, Burgerdijk, Blijdendijk, Blommersdijk, Breedijk, Boschdijk and Beemsterdijk, the latter which hit a mine off Pembrokeshire in 1941 with 40 lives lost.

Wreck
The wreck, which today remains completely broken, sank to her final resting place at a depth of 27 metres at Lulworth Banks, South of Beacon. The wreck today lies north-east/south-west, with various parts of her standing 7–8 metres of the coarse clean stone shingle and rock seabed. From inside the site, the hull is full of soft sand. Most of the wreck became broken after various salvage operations, although the wreck remains substantial and often diveable in comparison to most other wrecks that were blown out, due to her location in the relative lea of Portland and inside the shambles bank. However the wreck also rests close to the Portland Race and so strong currents can be found.

The stern remains completely intact, with doors left hanging open, and glass remaining in windows, whilst whole parts of the vessel can be seen intact. Part of the ship's cargo on its final journey was tyres and copper wire, which remain evident around the wreck. A possible aircraft tyre or gun carriage tyre remains attached to the side of the wreck - roughly a metre in diameter. Removing the layer of silt on diving visits has revealed the tread pattern is still sharp and clear. Within this part of the wreck, copper windings for a small electric motor with loose wiring can be found. Salvaging blasting has opened the ship up in various places. The stern and into the engine room remains largely intact.

As many of the ship's plates and ribs remain intact, lobster and conger eel can be found at the wreck, whilst large shoals of Bib and Pollack can also be found at the site. It also holds a large population of Tom Pot Blennies and both edible and spider crabs. Apart from being a popular diving site, local fishermen are also fond of the spot, and the wreck holds a collection of lost pots and fishing tackle.

References

Maritime incidents in October 1939
1921 ships
Ships built in the Netherlands
Steamships of the Netherlands
Merchant ships of the Netherlands
World War II merchant ships of the Netherlands
Ships sunk by mines
Ships sunk by German submarines in World War II
World War II shipwrecks in the English Channel